Wynn Thomas Underwood (August 27, 1927–October 20, 2005) was an American attorney, political figure, and judge from Vermont. He twice served as a member of the Vermont House of Representatives, and served as an associate justice of the Vermont Supreme Court from 1980 to 1985.

Biography
Underwood grew up on a farm in Sudbury, Vermont. He attended the one-room Hill School in Orwell and then Brandon High School and Berkshire School in Sheffield, Massachusetts. Underwood attended Dartmouth College for two years before enlisting in the U.S. Army during World War II; he fought with the 87th Mountain Infantry Regiment ski troops (later merged into the 10th Mountain Division).

After returning home, Underwood traveled the Caribbean as a freelance writer until returning home to Vermont. In 1947, at the age of twenty-one, he was elected as a Democrat to the Vermont House of Representatives as the representative of Sudbury. He was one of the youngest members of the Vermont General Assembly.

Using the G.I. Bill, Wynn attended Boston University Law School, receiving his J.D. in 1952. Wynn served his legal apprenticeship with Asa Bloomer in Rutland, and then practiced two years with Osmer C. Fitts in Brattleboro before opening his own law office in Middlebury. Wynn was elected state's attorney for Addison County, serving from 1955 to 1957. Wynn then joined the law firm of Conley, Foote & Underwood in Middlebury from 1957 to 1962, and then formed his own law firm, Underwood, Lynch & Ketcham in Middlebury 1962 to 1972. Wynn was chairman of the Middlebury selectboard from 1967 to 1972. Wynn was president of the Vermont Trial Lawyers Association from 1969 to 1970 and was president of the Addison County Bar Association from 1968 to 1970.

Wynn was counsel to U.S. Senator George Aiken in 1965, during the process of passing the legislation that created the Tri-Town Water District, the nation's first rural water bill, which benefited Addison, Bridport, and Shoreham. President Lyndon B. Johnson invited Wynn to the White House for the signing of the bill.

In 1970, Wynn was again elected to the Vermont House of Representatives, from Middlebury, Weybridge, and Ripton. During his term, a vacancy opened on the Vermont Superior Court, and Wynn was named to the position by joint election of the House and Senate. Wynn served on the Superior Court from 1972 to 1980. In one of his best-known cases, Wynn presided over a landmark 1977 Chittenden Superior Court case in which the plaintiff, who was paralyzed in a skiing accident, won a $1.5 million judgment, which at the time was believed to be the largest in the state's history. Underwood ruled that the case could proceed, and that the inherent risks of skiing did not automatically bar seeking damages. In a 1980 interview, Underwood said that as a result of this ruling, he received "poison-pen letters from the length and breadth of the United States."

In 1980, Governor Richard A. Snelling appointed Wynn to the Vermont Supreme Court as an associate justice, succeeding Rudolph J. Daley. Wynn served in that position from 1980 to 1985. He was known for his pro-individual rights philosophy. After Snelling selected Frederic W. Allen, who was not previously a judge, to be chief justice in late 1984, Wynn abruptly resigned, stating that was disappointed in being passed over. The vacancy created by Underwood's resignation allowed the incoming governor, Democrat Madeleine Kunin, to make an appointment in her first year in office.

Wynn was elected president of the Vermont Bar Association, and served from 1981 to 1982. He served as vice chairman of the Judicial Conduct Board from 1991 to 1996.

Underwood died at his home in Shelburne on October 20, 2005, after a long illness.

Personal life
Underwood was survived by his wife of fifty-six years, Sharry, his five children and their families, and two sisters. He was described as an avid hunter and fisherman and a down-to-earth man who "was the last judge to have a spittoon in his chambers."

Notes

1927 births
2005 deaths
Berkshire School alumni
Dartmouth College alumni
Boston University School of Law alumni
Members of the Vermont House of Representatives
People from Sudbury, Vermont
Vermont lawyers
State's attorneys in Vermont
Vermont state court judges
Justices of the Vermont Supreme Court
20th-century American judges
People from Middlebury, Vermont
20th-century American politicians
20th-century American lawyers